Kaikōura District Council is the territorial authority for the Kaikōura District of New Zealand.

The council is led by the mayor of Kaikōura, who is currently . There are also seven councillors, elected at large.

Composition

Councillors

 Mayor 
 Councillors at large: Deputy Mayor Julie Howden, Lisa Bond, Robby Roche, Vicki Gulleford, Tony Blunt, Neil Pablecheque, Derrick Millton

History

The council was established in 1989, directly replacing the Kaikoura County Council established in 1876.

In 2020, the council had 40 staff, including 8 earning more than $100,000. According to the Taxpayers' Union think tank, residential rates averaged $2,385.

References

External links

 Official website

Kaikōura District
Politics of Canterbury, New Zealand
Territorial authorities of New Zealand